Ptghni, is a village located in the Kotayk Province of Armenia along the left bank of the Hrazdan River. It was founded in 1831 in the vicinity of an abandoned dwelling. The village has a school, kindergarten, house of culture, and a library. The local economy is dependent on agriculture and local inhabitants primarily grow grapes, melons, gourds, and breed cattle. Within the village are the remains of fortress walls and Ptghavank of the 6th to 7th-century.

Gallery

See also 
Kotayk Province

References 

World Gazeteer: Armenia – World-Gazetteer.com

Ptghnavank Monastery
Ptghnavank2
Ptghnavank3
Ptghnavank4
Ptghnavank5

External links 
 Communities Association of Armenia: Ptghni
Ptghnavank MonasteryPtghnavank2Ptghnavank3Ptghnavank4Ptghnavank5

Populated places in Kotayk Province